The 1998 Vodacom Cup was played between 18 February and 28 May 2014 and was the 1st edition of this annual domestic cup competition. This edition of the Vodacom Cup was played between the fourteen provincial rugby union teams in South Africa.

Competition

There were fourteen teams participating in the 1998 Vodacom Cup. These teams were geographically divided into two sections - Section A (south-western section) and Section B (north-eastern section), with seven teams in each section. Teams played all the other teams in their section twice over the course of the season, once at home and once away.

Teams received four log points for a win and two log points for a draw. Bonus log points were awarded to teams that scored four or more tries in a game, as well as to teams that lost a match by seven points or less. Teams were ranked by log points, then points difference (points scored less points conceded).

The top two teams in each section qualified for the play-offs. In the semi-finals, the teams that finished first in each section had home advantage against the teams that finished second in the other section. The winners of these semi-finals then played each other in the final.

Teams

Team Listing
The following teams took part in the 1998 Vodacom Cup competition:

Round-robin stage

Logs

The final logs at the completion of the round-robin stage were as follows:

Results

Section A

Round one

Round two

Round three

Round four

Round five

Round six

Round seven

Round eight

Round nine

Round ten

Round eleven

Round twelve

Round thirteen

Round fourteen

Section B

Round one

Round two

Round three

Round four

Round five

Round six

Round seven

Round eight

Round nine

Round ten

Round eleven

Round twelve

Round thirteen

Round fourteen

Play-Offs

Semi-finals

Final

Winners

References

Vodacom Cup
1998 in South African rugby union
1998 rugby union tournaments for clubs